Old Peak Road is a road in the Mid-Levels on Hong Kong Island, Hong Kong. It is the most direct path from Victoria Gap and Victoria Peak to Central on Hong Kong Island. The highest altitude is about 350 meters, the highest altitude of the driving road is about 200 meters, which is the Dynasty Court, and the mountain road is 350 meters.

History
Formerly known as the Peak Road, the Old Peak Road was built in the 1920s and used to be the only way to the Peak. In the 1960s, Peak Road was renamed Old Peak Road, while a section of Stubbs Road connecting Wan Chai Gap and Victoria Peak was renamed Peak Road. One of only six "Victoria City Boundaries" in Hong Kong is still preserved.

Features
Old Peak Road in the Mid-levels is full of strata luxury housing estates, most of which are over 1,000 square feet, including Garden Terrace, Dynasty Court and Hillsborough Court. In addition, the 2-storey Peak Depot, located at No. 102 Old Peak Road in the Peak District, was built in the 1910s and served as an office, warehouse and staff quarters for the Water Supplies Department at that time. Historical documents show that the warehouse was once the dormitory of Shangshan Jiaobi, and was rated as a second-class historical building by the Antiquities Office.

See also
 List of streets and roads in Hong Kong

References

External links

Mid-Levels
Roads on Hong Kong Island